Dragon's Mouth is a 1952 play by J.B. Priestley and his wife Jacquetta Hawkes. It features four characters on a yacht trapped in quarantine off the West Indies, discussing life.

It premiered at the Malvern Festival before transferring to the Winter Garden Theatre in London's West End, running for 55 performances. It starred Rosamund John, Dulcie Gray, Michael Denison and Norman Wooland.

References

Bibliography
 Wearing, J.P. The London Stage 1950-1959: A Calendar of Productions, Performers, and Personnel.  Rowman & Littlefield, 2014.

1952 plays
Plays by J. B. Priestley
West End plays